Luis Hernández (born November 5, 1992, in Aguascalientes City, Aguascalientes) is a Mexican professional footballer who plays for Sonora on loan from Necaxa of Ascenso MX.

References

Living people
Mexican footballers
1992 births
People from Aguascalientes City
Association footballers not categorized by position
Footballers from Aguascalientes
21st-century Mexican people